Feltia subterranea, formerly known as Agrotis subterranea, and commonly known as the granulate cutworm or tawny shoulder, is a moth of the family Noctuidae. It is found in North America, from Massachusetts and New York to California and the southern parts of the United States and Mexico. It is also present in Central America and South America where it has been reported in Honduras, Costa Rica, Cuba, Panama, Venezuela, Colombia, South-East Brazil, Uruguay, Chile, the Antilles.

The wingspan is 38–44 mm.

The larvae feed on a wide range of plants, including over 61 hosts of economic importance.

The adults are a pollinator of fetterbush lyonia.

References

External links
Feltia subterranea on the UF / IFAS Featured Creatures website.

Noctuinae
Moths of North America
Moths of South America
Moths described in 1794